William Lagesson (born 22 February 1996) is a Swedish professional ice hockey defenceman for the Chicago Wolves in the American Hockey League (AHL) while under contract to the Carolina Hurricanes of the National Hockey League (NHL). He was selected by the Edmonton Oilers in the fourth round, 91st overall, in the 2014 NHL Entry Draft.

Playing career
Lagesson played as a youth in his native Sweden within the Frölunda HC organization. Following his second season in the J20 SuperElit, Lagesson was drafted in his first year of eligibility by the Edmonton Oilers in the fourth-round, 91st overall, of the 2014 NHL Entry Draft. Opting to continue his development in North America, Lagesson was selected 11th overall in the 2014 USHL Entry Draft by the Dubuque Fighting Saints.

He played in the 2014–15 season with the Fighting Saints of the USHL, before committing to a collegiate career with the University of Massachusetts Amherst of the Hockey East.

Lagesson played two years with the struggling Minutemen program before leaving after his sophomore season and deciding to turn pro, in signing a three-year entry-level contract with the Edmonton Oilers on April 7, 2017.

On May 8, 2017, it was announced by the Oilers that Lagesson would spend the 2017–18 season in Sweden on loan with Djurgårdens IF of the SHL. While with Djurgården, Lagesson made his professional debut in solidifying a regular role on the blueline. In 49 appearances, he contributed with 1 goal and 12 assists for 13 points in the regular season. He continued his steady play in the post-season with an assist in 11 games.

Returning to the Oilers over the summer, and after participating in the NHL training camp, Lagesson was assigned to begin the 2018–19 season with AHL affiliate, the Bakersfield Condors, on September 20, 2018.

As an impending restricted free agent with the Oilers and with the commencement 2020–21 North American indefinitely delayed, Lagesson signed a one-year contract in Sweden with second-tier club, HC Vita Hästen of the HockeyAllsvenskan, on 23 September 2020.

On 21 March 2022, Lagesson was traded by the Oilers, along with a conditional second round pick and 2024 seventh-round pick to the Montreal Canadiens in exchange for Brett Kulak.

Following the conclusion of his contract with the Canadiens, Lagesson as a free agent was signed to a one-year, two-way contract with the Carolina Hurricanes on 25 July 2022.

Career statistics

Regular season and playoffs

International

References

External links

1996 births
Bakersfield Condors players
Chicago Wolves players
Djurgårdens IF Hockey players
Dubuque Fighting Saints players
Edmonton Oilers draft picks
Edmonton Oilers players
Kristianstads IK players
Living people
Montreal Canadiens players
UMass Minutemen ice hockey players
Swedish ice hockey defencemen
HC Vita Hästen players
Ice hockey people from Gothenburg